Sabine von Heusinger (born 13 September 1964) is professor of medieval history at the University of Cologne.

Early life
Sabine von Heusinger was born 13 September 1964 in Rielasingen. She studied German, politics and history at the University of Konstanz and Università degli Studi dell 'Aquila. In 1991, her Magister followed. She earned her doctorate at the University of Konstanz with a thesis on "Der observante Dominikaner Johannes Mulberg († 1414) und der Basler Beginenstreit". Her Habilitation took place in 2006 at the University of Mannheim with work on social groups in the city - the example of the guilds in Strasbourg.

Career
Von Heusinger taught at the Universities of Konstanz, Luzern and Stuttgart. Since 2000 she has been working at the University of Mannheim. In Mannheim, she was a research associate since October 2007 and an Academic Counselor since February 2008. In 2008/2009, she had a visiting professor of Medieval history at the University of Bielefeld. In 2010, she was a senior fellow at the University of Konstanz. From 2011, she teaches as the successor to Eberhard Isenmann as professor of medieval history at the University of Cologne with emphasis on the late Middle Ages.

Her main fields of expertise are the history of history, the history of the church, the history of religions and confessions, the history of everyday life, the family, life forms, women and gender, regional, urban and local history as well as social, political and cultural orders.

Selected publications
 Die Zunft im Mittelalter. Zur Verflechtung von Politik, Wirtschaft und Gesellschaft in Straßburg (= Vierteljahrschrift für Sozial- und Wirtschaftsgeschichte. Bd. 206). Steiner, Stuttgart 2009, (= Zugleich: Mannheim, Universität, Habilitations-Schrift, 2006) (Rezension)
 Johannes Mulberg OP († 1414). Ein Leben im Spannungsfeld von Dominikanerobservanz und Beginenstreit (= Quellen und Forschungen zur Geschichte des Dominikanerordens. Bd. 9). Akademie-Verlag, Berlin 2000,  (Zugleich: Konstanz, Universität, Dissertation, 1996).

References 

1964 births
20th-century German historians
German women historians
Historians of Germany
Academic staff of the University of Cologne
University of Konstanz alumni
Academic staff of the University of Mannheim
Living people
21st-century German historians